Zhou Ying may refer to:

Zhou Ying (actress) (born 1984), Chinese actress based in Singapore
Zhou Ying (table tennis) (born 1988), Chinese table tennis player
Zhou Ying (swimmer) (born 1989), Chinese paralympic swimmer

See also
Nancy Zhou (born 1993), Chinese-American violinist, Chinese name Zhou Ying (周颖)